Aleksandar "Saša" Pejanović (1974 – 30 May 2011) was a Montenegrin Serb boxer who represented Serbia & Montenegro internationally. He had been a policeman until 2006 when he was fired for allegedly physically attacking an employee at the Hotel Crna Gora casino. Pejanović was also a known supporter of Serbian–Montenegrin unionism, and was arrested during the riot after Montenegro's recognition of Kosovo independence in 2008. He was brutally beaten while incarcerated, leading to a trial against the alleged perpetrators within the police force, this gained wide media attention. In 2011, while Pejanović was sitting on the terrace of a cafe in Podgorica, he was fatally shot  in the chest by his neighbor Zoran Bulatović. He was the son of Đuro Pejanović, a writer.

Competition
Boxing at the 2001 Mediterranean Games, Bronze, together with Geard Ajetović.

Sources

Sources

1974 births
2011 deaths
Serbian murder victims
Montenegrin murder victims
People murdered in Montenegro
Serbian male boxers
Serbs of Montenegro

Mediterranean Games bronze medalists for Yugoslavia
Competitors at the 2001 Mediterranean Games
Mediterranean Games medalists in boxing
Super-heavyweight boxers